"Caught in the Middle" is a song by British-Norwegian boy band A1. It was released on 21 January 2002 as the lead single from their third studio album, Make It Good (2002). The song peaked at number two on the UK Singles Chart and received a silver certification from the British Phonographic Industry in October 2018. It became one of their most successful and recognised singles. It was also released in a French-English version with singer Eve Angeli.

In the United States, the song received moderate airplay and charted for seven weeks in the top 50 of the Radio & Records Mainstream chart, peaking at number 46. It was their only single to chart in the United States.

Lyrical content
Lyrically, the singer is an individual lamenting the fact that they cannot seem to stop dwelling on a previous partner despite the fact that their new relationship and situation are better, which they acknowledge.

Track listings

 UK CD1
 "Caught in the Middle"
 "You're Not in Love" 
 "Power of Desire" 
 "Caught in the Middle" (CD extra video)

 UK CD2
 "Caught in the Middle" (acoustic)
 "One More Try" (acoustic)
 "2:59"
 "One More Try" (acoustic CD extra video)

 UK cassette single and European CD single
 "Caught in the Middle"
 "Caught in the Middle" (Almighty mix)

 Australian CD single
 "Caught in the Middle"
 "One More Try" (acoustic)
 "2:59"
 "Same Old Brand New You" (album version)
 "Caught in the Middle" (Almighty mix)

Personnel
Personnel are lifted from the UK CD1 liner notes.
 Ben Adams – writing
 Paul Marazzi – writing
 Chris Porter – writing
 Rick Mitra – writing
 Mike Hedges – production
 Ash Howes – mixing
 Chris Blair – mastering

Charts

Weekly charts

Year-end charts

Certifications

References

2002 singles
2002 songs
A1 (band) songs
Song recordings produced by Mike Hedges
Songs written by Ben Adams
Songs written by Paul Marazzi

pt:Caught in the Middle